Kenneth Carroll Guinn (August 24, 1936 – July 22, 2010), was an American academic administrator, businessman and politician who served as the 27th Governor of Nevada from 1999 to 2007 and interim president of the University of Nevada, Las Vegas (UNLV) from 1994 to 1995. Originally a Democrat, he later joined the Republican Party prior to being elected governor.

Early life and career

Guinn was born in Garland, Arkansas and reared in Exeter, California. He married his wife, Dema, in Reno on July 7, 1956. They had two sons, Jeff and Steve. He earned undergraduate and graduate degrees in physical education from California State University, Fresno. He received his Bachelor of Arts in 1957. In 1970, Guinn earned an Ed.D. from Utah State University in Logan.

Guinn was the superintendent of the Clark County School District from 1969 to 1978. From 1978 to 1987, he was vice president of Nevada Savings and Loan. From 1987 to 1988, he was president and chairman of the board of the same institution under its new name PriMerit Bank. From 1988 to 1993, he was chairman and chief executive officer of Southwest Gas Corporation and from 1993 to 1997 he was the chairman of the board of directors of that company.

Political career
Guinn was first elected governor in 1998, defeating Democratic nominee Las Vegas Mayor Jan Laverty Jones, with 52% of the vote. When Guinn ran for re-election in 2002, he received 68% of the vote, defeating Democratic nominee state Senator Joe Neal, who received only 22%. In November 2005, Time magazine named him one of the five best governors in the U.S.

As Governor of Nevada, Guinn developed a reputation as a moderate Republican who was not motivated by partisan ideology. During his first term as governor, Guinn used the national tobacco settlement money, and pushed for the creation of the Millennium Scholarship program to provide all Nevada High School graduates with a 3.25 GPA, a scholarship to attend a Nevada university. He also championed a state run prescription drug benefit program for Nevada senior citizens called Senior RX. Guinn, who prided himself on his detailed knowledge of the state budget, believed Nevada's tax structure was inherently flawed with its dependence on growth and tourism—Nevada has no income tax and relies heavily on gaming and sales tax.

Guinn proposed a tax restructuring during the 2003 legislative session that was met with opposition from anti-tax business groups and many anti-tax Republicans. After a divisive session that divided the Republicans and ended in a Nevada Supreme Court decision upholding the passage of the bill very little of Guinn's original proposal was enacted. As Guinn had predicted the state was plunged into a serious budget deficit as soon as the 2008 recession hit the gaming and construction industry causing sales and gaming tax revenues to plummet. In percentage terms, Guinn's 2003 tax hike was the largest tax increase ever by one of the 50 states, but it was praised as "a controversial but realistic step to shore up the overstretched budget of the nation's fastest-growing state."

In 2006, Guinn declined to endorse Jim Gibbons, the Republican nominee for Governor of Nevada, due to bitter disagreements between the two politicians. Gibbons was one of the more vocal critics of Guinn's tax plan during the 2003 legislative session. Guinn said only that he hoped a Republican would succeed him as governor. Gibbons defeated the Democratic nominee, Dina Titus. Guinn's second term as governor ended on January 1, 2007, due to lifetime term limits established by the Nevada Constitution. His official portrait was painted by artist Michele Rushworth and hangs in the state capitol in Carson City, Nevada.

Guinn served as a board member of MGM Resorts International (formerly MGM Mirage) from May 22, 2007, until his untimely death on July 22, 2010, under chairman and CEO Terrence Lanni (1995–2008) and James Murren (2008–present).

Death 
Guinn died on July 22, 2010, at the age of 73, of complications from injuries sustained after falling from the roof of his Las Vegas home and possibly following a heart attack. He was pronounced dead at the University Medical Center of Southern Nevada in Las Vegas.

Guinn is interred at the Exeter District Cemetery in Exeter, California.

References

External links
 
 State biographies (October 2006, via archive.org)
 
 
 A list of quotes by Guinn
 On the Issues
 The Anointed One, huntingtonpress.com
 

|-

|-

1936 births
2010 deaths
Accidental deaths from falls
Accidental deaths in Nevada
School superintendents in Nevada
California State University, Fresno alumni
Governors of Nevada
Nevada Democrats
Nevada Republicans
Politicians from Carson City, Nevada
People from the Las Vegas Valley
People from Exeter, California
Presidents of the University of Nevada, Las Vegas
Republican Party governors of Nevada
Utah State University alumni
20th-century American Episcopalians